The women's featherweight boxing event at the 2020 Summer Olympics is scheduled to take place between 24 July and 3 August 2021 at the Ryōgoku Kokugikan. 20 boxers from 20 nations are expected to compete.

Background
This will be the debut appearance of the women's featherweight event. The previous women's tournaments in 2012 and 2016 skipped directly from flyweight (48–51 kg) to lightweight (57–60 kg). Featherweight fills some of that gap, at 54–57 kg.

Reigning World Champion Nesthy Petecio of the Philippines has qualified for the Games.

Qualification

A National Olympic Committee (NOC) could enter only 1 qualified boxer in the weight class. There were 20 quota places available for the women's featherweight, allocated as follows:

 2 places at the 2020 African Boxing Olympic Qualification Tournament.
 4 places at the 2020 Asia & Oceania Boxing Olympic Qualification Tournament.
 6 places at the 2020 European Boxing Olympic Qualification Tournament.
 3 places that were intended to be awarded at the 2021 Pan American Boxing Olympic Qualification Tournament, which was cancelled. These places were instead awarded through the world ranking list to the top boxers from the Americas who had been registered for the qualification tournament.
 4 places that were intended to be awarded at a World Olympic Qualifying Tournament, which was cancelled. These places were instead awarded through the world ranking list, with one place for each continental zone (Africa, Asia & Oceania, Europe, Americas).
 1 place for a Tripartite Commission invitation.

The host nation, Japan, was guaranteed a minimum of two places across the five women's boxing events; because Japan qualified boxers in the flyweight and featherweight through the Asia & Oceania tournament, no host places were used in any women's weight class.

Competition format
Like all Olympic boxing events, the competition is a straight single-elimination tournament. The competition begins with a preliminary round, where the number of competitors is reduced to 16, and concludes with a final. As there are fewer than 32 boxers in the competition, a number of boxers will receive a bye through the preliminary round. Both semifinal losers are awarded bronze medals.

Bouts consist of three three-minute rounds with a one-minute break between rounds. A boxer may win by knockout or by points. Scoring is on the "10-point-must" system, with 5 judges scoring each round. Judges consider "number of blows landed on the target areas, domination of the bout, technique and tactical superiority and competitiveness." Each judge determines a winner for each round, who receives 10 points for the round, and assigns the round's loser a number of points between 7 and 9 based on performance. The judge's scores for each round are added to give a total score for that judge. The boxer with the higher score from a majority of the judges is the winner.

Schedule
The featherweight starts with the round of 32 on 24 July. There is a single rest day before the round of 16 on 26 July, one more before the quarterfinals on 28 July, two more before the semifinals on 31 July, and two more before the final on 3 August. The women's featherweight will be the first boxing final in 2020.

Results

Finals

Top half

Bottom half

References

External links
Draw 

Boxing at the 2020 Summer Olympics
Women's events at the 2020 Summer Olympics